Veaceslav Zagaevschi (born 4 April 1996) is a Moldovan professional footballer who plays as a midfielder.

Football career
Zagaevschi made his professional debut for Zimbru in the Divizia Națională on 6 May 2016 against Zaria Bălți, coming on as a 38th-minute substitute.

Notes

References

External links

Veaceslav Zagaevschi at Zimbru.md

1996 births
Living people
Moldovan footballers
FC Zimbru Chișinău players
Moldovan Super Liga players
Association football midfielders